Platovka is a rural locality (a selo) in Klyuchevsky Selsoviet, Klyuchevsky District, Altai Krai, Russia. The population was 269 as of 2013. There are 3 streets.

Geography 
Platovka is located 17 km north of Klyuchi (the district's administrative centre) by road. Tselinny and Klyuchi are the nearest rural localities.

References 

Rural localities in Klyuchevsky District